Llywelyn Fawr ('the Elder') ap Maredudd ap Cynan ab Owain Gwynedd was a second cousin of Gruffudd ap Llywelyn and Dafydd ap Llywelyn of the royal house of Gwynedd in the 13th century.

Llywelyn's father was Prince Maredudd, who fought alongside his brother in an alliance with Llywelyn the Great to depose their uncle Dafydd in 1195. As Lord of Meirionnydd, the cantref was confirmed by Henry III of England in 1241. Also part of the House of Aberffraw, Llywelyn fought on the side of Dafydd ap Llywelyn (Prince Dafydd II) in 1245. Llywelyn's grandson Madog ap Llywelyn was integral in the revolt of 1294.

Llywelyn Fawr ap Maredudd had a younger brother also called Llywelyn, who is sometimes referred to as Llywelyn Fychan ('the Younger'). Very little is known about Llywelyn Fawr ap Maredudd except that he had a son called Maredudd.

References

Bibliography

12th-century Welsh people
Welsh people of Irish descent
Welsh royalty
Year of birth missing
Year of death missing